The Éditions Vagabonde, established in 2002, is an independent French publishing house. They focus on literature, proposing classical authors or "frondeurs".

Authors 
Hugo Ball
Georg Büchner
 Guido Cavalcanti 
Céline Curiol
Raphaële Eschenbrenner
Antonio de Guevara
László Krasznahorkai
William Langewiesche
Flann O'Brien

Nick Tosches

Carl Watson

On 10 November 2012, Danièle Robert was awarded the Nelly Sachs Prize for her (bilingual) translation and critical edition of Rime, by Guido Cavalcanti. The work was published in March 2012 by vagabonde.

External links 
 Éditions Vagabonde on Babelio
 Éditions Vagabonde on Tête de lecture

Companies established in 2002
Vagabonde
French speculative fiction publishers
2002 establishments in France